Bansberia Ganges High School is a school situated in Bansberia in Hooghly district in the state of West Bengal, India near Bandel railway station.

The school's foundation was laid in 1992. It was formed with the help of the local people and workers of Bansberia Ganges Jute Mill and with the help of the mill owner who gave the land and money necessary to raise the building for school.

Mr. Rabindra Nath Tiwari is the headmaster of the school.

Considering demand for establishing school surrounding Bansberia Ganges Jute Mill area local people had established two schools one in Hindi medium and another in partly Urdu &  partly Telugu. Professor Narayan Ch Ghosh, Mathematician was associated with both the attempt as he was trade union leader there. Later Bansberia Ganges High School was established to cater students of noted schools. Bansberia Ganges High School is a school situated in Bansberia in Hooghly district in the state of West Bengal, India near Bandel railway station.
The school's foundation was laid in 1992. It was formed with the help of the local people and workers of Bansberia Ganges Jute Mill and with the help of the mill owner who gave the land and money necessary to raise the building for school.

Mr. Rabindra Nath Tiwari is the headmaster of the school.

References

High schools and secondary schools in West Bengal
Schools in Hooghly district
Educational institutions established in 1992
1992 establishments in West Bengal